The 1981–82 NBA season saw the Lakers win their third NBA Championship in Los Angeles, and their eighth overall in franchise history.

Draft picks

Regular season
On November 18, 1981, at halftime while on the road at Utah, Magic Johnson and coach Paul Westhead had a verbal altercation in the locker room. It was stated by teammate Kareem Abdul-Jabbar that Johnson had offered input on the game, which resulted in Westhead twice telling him to "Shut up."  Johnson then told reporters after this game that he would like to be traded anywhere, resulting in a barrage of media coverage. One day after these events, Lakers owner Jerry Buss held a press conference at The Forum, where he announced the firing of Westhead, with his replacement being Pat Riley as "coach" and general manager Jerry West as "offensive coach". West came to the podium and clarified to media that Riley was indeed the head coach and that West himself would simply provide him support on the bench, which lasted for a period of 12 games. Although Johnson denied responsibility for Westhead's firing, he was booed across the league, even by Lakers' fans However, Buss was also unhappy with the Lakers offense and had intended on firing Westhead days before the Westhead–Johnson altercation, but assistant GM West and GM Bill Sharman had convinced Buss to delay his decision.

Season standings

c - clinched homecourt advantage
y - clinched division title
x - clinched playoff spot

Record vs. opponents

Game log

Regular season

|- align="center" bgcolor="#ffcccc"
| 1
| October 30, 1981
| Houston
| L 112–113 (2OT)
|
|
|
| The Forum
| 0–1

|- align="center" bgcolor="#ccffcc"
| 2
| November 3, 1981
| @ Portland
| L 102–100
|
|
|
| Memorial Coliseum
| 0-2
|- align="center" bgcolor="#ffcccc"
| 3
| November 4, 1981
| @ Seattle
| W 106–103
|
|
|
| Kingdome
| 1–2
|- align="center" bgcolor="#ffcccc"
| 4
| November 6, 1981
| Phoenix
| L 99–101
|
|
|
| The Forum
| 1–3
|- align="center" bgcolor="#ffcccc"
| 6
| November 10, 1981
| @ San Antonio
| L 102–128
|
|
|
| HemisFair Arena
| 2–4
|- align="center" bgcolor="#ccffcc"
| 7
| November 11, 1981
| @ Houston
| W 95–93
|
|
|
| The Summit
| 3–4
|- align="center" bgcolor="#ccffcc"
| 9
| November 14, 1981
| @ Phoenix
| W 98–97
|
|
|
| Arizona Veterans Memorial Coliseum
| 5–4
|- align="center" bgcolor="#ccffcc"
| 11
| November 18, 1981
| @ Utah
| W 113–110
|
|
|
| Salt Palace
| 7–4
|- align="center" bgcolor="#ccffcc"
| 12
| November 20, 1981
| San Antonio
| W 136–116
|
|
|
| The Forum
| 8–4
|- align="center" bgcolor="#ccffcc"
| 15
| November 25, 1981
| @ San Antonio
| W 117–96
|
|
|
| HemisFair Arena
| 11–4
|- align="center" bgcolor="#ccffcc"
| 17
| November 29, 1981
| Houston
| W 122–104
|
|
|
| The Forum
| 12–5

|- align="center" bgcolor="#ffcccc"
| 19
| December 2, 1981
| @ Seattle
| L 96–104
|
|
|
| Kingdome
| 13–6
|- align="center" bgcolor="#ccffcc"
| 20
| December 4, 1981
| @ Denver
| W 126–117
|
|
|
| McNichols Sports Arena
| 14–6
|- align="center" bgcolor="#ccffcc"
| 22
| December 8, 1981
| Washington
| W 102–98
|
|
|
| The Forum
| 16–6
|- align="center" bgcolor="#ccffcc"
| 27
| December 20, 1981
| Atlanta
| W 112–94
|
|
|
| The Forum
| 20–7
|- align="center" bgcolor="#ccffcc"
| 29
| December 25, 1981
| @ Phoenix
| W 104–101
|
|
|
| Arizona Veterans Memorial Coliseum
| 22–7

|- align="center" bgcolor="#ffcccc"
| 32
| January 3, 1982
| Seattle
| L 90–110
|
|
|
| The Forum
| 24–8
|- align="center" bgcolor="#ffcccc"
| 35
| January 10, 1982
| @ Milwaukee
| L 107–118
|
|
|
| MECCA Arena
| 25–10
|- align="center" bgcolor="#ffcccc"
| 39
| January 19, 1982
| @ Denver
| L 139–140
|
|
|
| McNichols Sports Arena
| 28–11
|- align="center" bgcolor="#ccffcc"
| 40
| January 20, 1982
| New Jersey
| W 132–113
|
|
|
| The Forum
| 29–11
|- align="center" bgcolor="#ffcccc"
| 42
| January 26, 1982
| Milwaukee
| L 94–96
|
|
|
| The Forum
| 30–12
|- align="center" bgcolor="#ccffcc"
| 43
| January 28, 1982
| Phoenix
| W 97–87
|
|
|
| The Forum
| 31–12
|- align="center"
|colspan="9" bgcolor="#bbcaff"|All-Star Break
|- style="background:#cfc;"
|- bgcolor="#bbffbb"

|- align="center" bgcolor="#ccffcc"
| 46
| February 5, 1982
| @ Washington
| W 90–87
|
|
|
| Capital Centre
| 32–14
|- align="center" bgcolor="#ccffcc"
| 47
| February 7, 1982
| @ Boston
| W 119–113
|
|
|
| Boston Garden
| 33–14
|- align="center" bgcolor="#ccffcc"
| 48
| February 9, 1982
| @ Atlanta
| W 130–117
|
|
|
| The Omni
| 34–14
|- align="center" bgcolor="#ffcccc"
| 50
| February 12, 1982
| San Antonio
| L 94–100
|
|
|
| The Forum
| 34–16
|- align="center" bgcolor="#ffcccc"
| 51
| February 14, 1982
| Boston
| L 103–108
|
|
|
| The Forum
| 34–17
|- align="center" bgcolor="#ccffcc"
| 52
| February 16, 1982
| Seattle
| W 108–101
|
|
|
| The Forum
| 35–17
|- align="center" bgcolor="#ccffcc"
| 54
| February 21, 1982
| @ Denver
| W 132–131
|
|
|
| McNichols Sports Arena
| 37–17
|- align="center" bgcolor="#ccffcc"
| 55
| February 23, 1982
| Denver
| W 145–129
|
|
|
| The Forum
| 38–17
|- align="center" bgcolor="#ccffcc"
| 56
| February 25, 1982
| @ Seattle
| W 104–98
|
|
|
| Kingdome
| 39–17
|- align="center" bgcolor="#ccffcc"
| 57
| February 26, 1982
| Philadelphia
| W 116–114 (2OT)
|
|
|
| The Forum
| 40–17

|- align="center" bgcolor="#ffcccc"
| 59
| March 3, 1982
| @ New Jersey
| L 103–111
|
|
|
| Brendan Byrne Arena
| 41–18
|- align="center" bgcolor="#ffcccc"
| 61
| March 7, 1982
| @ Philadelphia
| L 113–119
|
|
|
| The Spectrum
| 41–20
|- align="center" bgcolor="#ccffcc"
| 68
| March 21, 1982
| Houston
| W 107–102
|
|
|
| The Forum
| 47–21
|- align="center" bgcolor="#ffcccc"
| 70
| March 26, 1982
| @ San Antonio
| L 105–110
|
|
|
| HemisFair Arena
| 47–23

|- align="center" bgcolor="#ffcccc"
| 74
| April 2, 1982
| Phoenix
| L 99–109
|
|
|
| The Forum
| 50–24
|- align="center" bgcolor="#ccffcc"
| 76
| April 6, 1982
| @ Houston
| W 108–97
|
|
|
| The Summit
| 52–24
|- align="center" bgcolor="#ccffcc"
| 77
| April 9, 1982
| Denver
| W 153–128
|
|
|
| The Forum
| 53–24
|- align="center" bgcolor="#ccffcc"
| 78
| April 11, 1982
| Seattle
| W 107–104
|
|
|
| The Forum
| 54–24
|- align="center" bgcolor="#ccffcc"
| 82
| April 18, 1982
| @ Phoenix
| W 120–115
|
|
|
| Arizona Veterans Memorial Coliseum
| 57–25

Playoffs

|- align="center" bgcolor="#ccffcc"
| 1
| April 27, 1982
| Phoenix
| W 115–96
| Jamaal Wilkes (28)
| Bob McAdoo (12)
| Magic Johnson (10)
| The Forum13,623
| 1–0
|- align="center" bgcolor="#ccffcc"
| 2
| April 28, 1982
| Phoenix
| W 117–98
| Kareem Abdul-Jabbar (24)
| Magic Johnson (12)
| Magic Johnson (12)
| The Forum15,558
| 2–0
|- align="center" bgcolor="#ccffcc"
| 3
| April 30, 1982
| @ Phoenix
| W 114–106
| Jamaal Wilkes (26)
| Magic Johnson (14)
| Magic Johnson (9)
| Arizona Veterans Memorial Coliseum14,660
| 3–0
|- align="center" bgcolor="#ccffcc"
| 4
| May 2, 1982
| @ Phoenix
| W 112–107
| Jamaal Wilkes (24)
| Kareem Abdul-Jabbar (13)
| Magic Johnson (12)
| Arizona Veterans Memorial Coliseum11,932
| 4–0
|-

|- align="center" bgcolor="#ccffcc"
| 1
| May 9, 1982
| San Antonio
| W 128–117
| Kareem Abdul-Jabbar (32)
| Magic Johnson (16)
| Magic Johnson (14)
| The Forum15,700
| 1–0
|- align="center" bgcolor="#ccffcc"
| 2
| May 11, 1982
| San Antonio
| W 110–101
| Nixon, Wilkes (22)
| Kurt Rambis (15)
| Nixon, Johnson (9)
| The Forum17,505
| 2–0
|- align="center" bgcolor="#ccffcc"
| 3
| May 14, 1982
| @ San Antonio
| W 118–108
| Kareem Abdul-Jabbar (26)
| Johnson, Abdul-Jabbar (10)
| Nixon, Johnson (10)
| HemisFair Arena15,800
| 3–0
|- align="center" bgcolor="#ccffcc"
| 4
| May 15, 1982
| @ San Antonio
| W 128–123
| Norm Nixon (30)
| Johnson, Abdul-Jabbar (9)
| Norm Nixon (10)
| HemisFair Arena15,800
| 4–0
|-

|- align="center" bgcolor="#ccffcc"
| 1
| May 27, 1982
| @ Philadelphia
| W 124–117
| Nixon, Wilkes (24)
| Magic Johnson (14)
| Norm Nixon (10)
| The Spectrum18,364
| 1–0
|- align="center" bgcolor="#ffcccc"
| 2
| May 30, 1982
| @ Philadelphia
| L 94–110
| Kareem Abdul-Jabbar (23)
| Magic Johnson (11)
| Norm Nixon (10)
| The Spectrum18,364
| 1–1
|- align="center" bgcolor="#ccffcc"
| 3
| June 1, 1982
| Philadelphia
| W 129–108
| Norm Nixon (29)
| Magic Johnson (9)
| Magic Johnson (8)
| The Forum17,505
| 2–1
|- align="center" bgcolor="#ccffcc"
| 4
| June 3, 1982
| Philadelphia
| W 111–101
| Johnson, Wilkes (24)
| Abdul-Jabbar, Rambis (11)
| Norm Nixon (14)
| The Forum17,505
| 3–1
|- align="center" bgcolor="#ffcccc"
| 5
| June 6, 1982
| @ Philadelphia
| L 102–135
| Bob McAdoo (23)
| Magic Johnson (10)
| Norm Nixon (13)
| The Spectrum18,364
| 3–2
|- align="center" bgcolor="#ccffcc"
| 6
| June 8, 1982
| Philadelphia
| W 114–104
| Jamaal Wilkes (27)
| Magic Johnson (13)
| Magic Johnson (13)
| The Forum17,505
| 4–2
|-

Player statistics

Season

Playoffs

Awards and records

Awards
 Magic Johnson, NBA Finals Most Valuable Player Award
 Magic Johnson, All-NBA Second Team
 Michael Cooper, NBA All-Defensive First Team

Records

Transactions

Trades

Free agents

Additions

Subtractions

References

External links
 

NBA championship seasons
Los
Los Angeles Lakers seasons
Western Conference (NBA) championship seasons
Los Angle
Los Angle